Long Sơn is a rural commune of Vũng Tàu in Bà Rịa–Vũng Tàu province, Vietnam.

The commune lies north of Vũng Tàu, it consists of Long Sơn Island and Gò Găng Island.

References

Communes of Bà Rịa-Vũng Tàu province
Populated places in Bà Rịa-Vũng Tàu province